Lin Chih-hsun (born 4 December 1980) is a Taiwanese cyclist. He competed in the men's track time trial at the 2004 Summer Olympics.

References

1980 births
Living people
Taiwanese male cyclists
Olympic cyclists of Taiwan
Cyclists at the 2004 Summer Olympics
Place of birth missing (living people)